The Bill Graham Civic Auditorium (formerly San Francisco Civic Auditorium) is a multi-purpose arena in San Francisco, California, named after promoter Bill Graham. The arena holds 8,500 people.

About the venue
The auditorium was designed by renowned Bay Area architects John Galen Howard, Frederick Herman Meyer and John W. Reid Jr. and built in 1915 as part of the Panama–Pacific International Exposition. The auditorium hosted the 1920 Democratic National Convention, the San Francisco Opera from 1923 to 1932 and again for the 1996 season, the National AAU boxing trials in 1948, and it was the home of the San Francisco Warriors of the National Basketball Association from 1964 to 1967. An underground expansion, named Brooks Hall, was completed in 1958 under the Civic Center Plaza, immediately north of the Civic Auditorium. The famous Mother of All Demos was presented here during the 1968 Fall Joint Computer Conference, and the World Cyber Games 2004 were also held here.

In 1992, the San Francisco Board of Supervisors voted to rename the auditorium after the rock concert impresario Bill Graham, who had died the previous year in a helicopter crash.

Long before Bill Graham came along, James T. Graham (no relation) managed the Civic Auditorium from 1954 to 1970 and booked some of the biggest names in show business there. During Jim's tenure, the Civic Auditorium hosted Elvis Presley (October 26, 1957), Judy Garland (September 13, 1961), Ray Charles, the Tijuana Brass, Donovan, the Jefferson Airplane (June 4, 1966), the Mamas and Papas (October 10, 1966), The Temptations and Gladys Night & the Pips (January 26, 1968), Jose Feliciano, Bobby Darin and more, which prompted San Francisco Chronicle columnist Herb Caen to opine that they (the S.F. Board of Supervisors) named the Civic Auditorium after the wrong Graham (January 12, 1993). Jim Graham signed the Warriors to a contract at the Civic in 1962 when they first moved from Philadelphia to San Francisco. The Warriors would play their first few seasons at the Civic before they moved to the Cow Palace, a larger venue. Jim was manager there when Brooks Halls was built as a convention center underground in the Civic Center, adjacent to the Auditorium. Dedicated on April 11, 1958, Jim Graham also managed Brooks Hall, where he booked American Medical Association conventions, the Harvest Festival, the San Francisco Gift Show and more.

Under Jim Graham's management, the Civic Auditorium also hosted Barnum & Bailey circuses, the San Francisco Roller Derby, Golden Gloves Boxing matches, professional wrestling, Holiday on Ice, the Ice Capades, car shows, the International Dog Show, the Black and White Ball and the Folderol. In addition, Jim Graham was manager of the Auditorium when President Dwight D. Eisenhower gave a speech there on August 23, 1956, on the 100th anniversary of the founding of the Republican Party, and when a fundraising gala was held there on June 1, 1968, for Democratic presidential hopeful Senator Robert Kennedy, a few days before he was assassinated in Los Angeles on June 5, 1968. At the time, the "Civic Auditorium" was ground zero in San Francisco for conventions and entertainment events. There was no other major venue for large gatherings, outside of the Cow Palace, which was considered ill-equipped for such events despite the fact that it was larger.

Later, the Civic Auditorium arena would continue to host concerts by many other famous artists, spanning many different genres. It is owned by the City and County of San Francisco and since 2010 has been operated by Another Planet Entertainment.

Concerts

See also
 List of convention centers in the United States
 List of tennis stadiums by capacity

References

Civic Center, San Francisco
Convention centers in California
Entertainment venues in San Francisco
Music venues in San Francisco
Sports venues in San Francisco
Basketball venues in California
San Francisco Warriors venues
Former National Basketball Association venues
Boxing venues in California
Tennis venues in California
Buildings and structures completed in 1915
Event venues established in 1915
1915 establishments in California
John Galen Howard buildings
NWA San Francisco
Esports venues in California
Civic Auditorium